Al Alberts (born Al Albertini, August 10, 1922 – November 27, 2009) was an American popular singer and composer.

Biography
Born Al Albertini in Chester, Pennsylvania, United States, he went to South Philadelphia High School. As a teenager, he appeared on the  Horn and Hardart Children's Hour, a radio program.

After graduating from South Philadelphia High School, he went to Temple University and the United States Navy, where he met Dave Mahoney. They went on to found The Four Aces.

The Four Aces recorded the song "Three Coins in the Fountain", written by Jule Styne for the film of the same name.  The song hit the No. 1 bestselling record twice in 1954, and won the Academy Award for Best Original Song the same year. Alberts also popularized the song "On the Way to Cape May", first through recording it, and then by performing it often on his later television show and specials.

The Four Aces biggest hit was "Love Is a Many-Splendored Thing", which was the theme to the 1955 film starring William Holden and Jennifer Jones. The song was a number one hit for four weeks, and it also won the Academy Award for best song.

In 1960 he recorded On The Way To Cape May, a song that has become a Jersey Shore sound summertime anthem for the Philadelphia/Delaware Valley and South Jersey Shore area. It was written by Maurice "Buddy" Nugent, according to BMI and The Philadelphia Inquirer. The song became popular without the push of a major record label. It has become popular in a variety of 21st-century media, such as XM satellite and internet radio, and also enjoys regular airplay on many Delaware Valley AM and FM stations.

Subsequently, he became a television personality in Philadelphia, where he hosted a one-hour Saturday afternoon talent show, called Al Alberts Showcase, first airing on WKBS-TV, and then on WPVI-TV that featured a panel of local children known as the "Teeny Boppers". Also there was a group of young teenage dancers called the "Show Stoppers".  Local talents of all ages would sing songs and perform dance routines. Most memorably, a young Andrew Pica made his debut on the show. Andrew would later go on to be a frequent guest and showstopper. Andrew would not go on to be a Hollywood star. Alberts would sit with the Teeny Boppers and they would each tell him a joke.  The show helped launch the careers of Andrea McArdle, and such acts/performers as Sister Sledge, The Kinleys, and Teddy Pendergrass. After 32 years, the show went off the air after Alberts' retirement in 2001.

Death and legacy
Alberts died at his home in Arcadia, Florida of complications from renal failure. He was cremated and his ashes were scattered in the sea.

The Broadcast Pioneers of Philadelphia posthumously inducted Alberts into their Hall of Fame in 2010.

References

External links
 Philly.Com: Al Alberts, TV talent host in Philly, dies at 87
 Former 6abc host Al Alberts has died November 27, 2009, last updated 12:11 pm EST
Al Alberts, Broadcast pioneer – Philadelphia-based
AlAlberts.com – artist's website
Anthony J. Biondo Jr. – Al Alberts Showcase Teenie Bopper – 1980s
Broadcast Pioneers of Philadelphia website
 Al Alberts recordings at the Discography of American Historical Recordings.

1922 births
2009 deaths
South Philadelphia High School alumni
People from Chester, Pennsylvania
Musicians from Philadelphia
Traditional pop music singers
American soul musicians
American people of Italian descent
Vee-Jay Records artists
American television personalities
Male television personalities
Deaths from kidney failure
20th-century American musicians
20th-century American singers
Television in Philadelphia
United States Navy personnel of World War II
Temple University alumni